Ed Wade (born January 31, 1956) is an American former professional baseball executive, who served as general manager of the Houston Astros and the Philadelphia Phillies of Major League Baseball (MLB).

Early career in baseball
After graduating from Temple University in 1977, Wade started his baseball career as an intern in the Philadelphia Phillies’ public relations department.

In October 1977, Wade was named public relations assistant for the Houston Astros and was promoted to public relations director in 1979; he suggested once that J.R. Richard could hold eight baseballs in his hand to celebrate back to back 300 strikeout seasons, which Richard did for a photo.

In May 1981, Wade left Houston to become the public relations director for the Pittsburgh Pirates, and remained with that club for five seasons.

In 1986, Wade returned to Houston to work as an associate for Tal Smith Enterprises, a firm which has provided consulting services to 26 of the 30 MLB clubs, with the most recognized functions being in preparation of arbitration cases, the financial appraisal of a franchise, contract negotiations and other baseball-related matters.

Wade worked for the company until May 5, 1989, when he rejoined the Phillies as assistant to the general manager. In 1995, he was promoted to assistant general manager.

At the Major League Expansion Draft in November 1997, Wade played a major role in the acquisition of future All Star outfielder Bobby Abreu; Abreu had been left unprotected by the Houston Astros in the Draft and was selected by the expansion Tampa Bay Devil Rays, who then traded Abreu to the Phillies for shortstop Kevin Stocker.

Work as the Phillies GM 
Wade was named as the Phillies interim General Manager in December 1997 and was promoted to the position of Vice President and General Manager in the spring of 1998.

During Wade's tenure with the Phillies, the team went through a major rebuild, including drafting and signing Brett Myers, Pat Burrell, future National League MVP Ryan Howard, Chase Utley, 2008 World Series MVP Cole Hamels and Ryan Madson; Wade also promoted future N.L. MVP shortstop Jimmy Rollins to the major leagues. The team also made an impactful international move when it signed Panamanian catcher Carlos Ruiz. Wade also selected outfielder Shane Victorino from the Los Angeles Dodgers in the 2004 Rule V Draft; Victorino would go on to star on World Series championship clubs in Philadelphia and Boston.

He also was responsible for trades of vocal Phillies players such as Curt Schilling and Scott Rolen. 

Wade traded Schilling (an eight year Phillie who was unhappy with the team's performance and demanded a trade) on July 26, 2000 to the Arizona Diamondbacks for baseman Travis Lee along with pitchers Vicente Padilla, Omar Daal and Nelson Figueroa. Padilla would be the only one to last more than two seasons with the Phillies while Schilling finished his career in 2007 after helping lead two teams to World Series titles. 

Friction between Rolen and Larry Bowa boiled over to where Rolen wanted a trade, even rejecting bids to resign a heavy deal with the team, rejecting a 10 year deal reportedly worth $140 million and instead signing a $8.6 million one-year deal (finding fault with a lack of spending on a team that was in the bottom third in payroll for 2001). In July 2002, he was traded along with Doug Nickle to the St. Louis Cardinals for Plácido Polanco, Mike Timlin, and Bud Smith. Polanco played the most for the Phillies and was later traded in 2005 to help Utley play regularly at second base, while Rolen won a title with St. Louis.

As revenues improved with the move from Veterans Stadium to Citizens Bank Park in 2003, Wade also signed future Hall of Fame first baseman Jim Thome and added other veterans such as David Bell, Billy Wagner, Kevin Millwood, Jon Lieber, Eric Milton and Kenny Lofton.

Prior to the 2004 season, Wade hired manager Charlie Manuel, who led the Phillies to a World Series Championship in 2008, their first world championship in 28 years.

After missing the 2005 playoffs by a one-game margin, Wade was dismissed and replaced by future Hall of Fame executive Pat Gillick. In Wade's eight seasons as VP/GM, the Phillies compiled a record of 643-652 (.497). However, in his final five seasons, the team went 426-383 (.527), the sixth-best record in the National League in that span. 

Three years after being fired, the core players drafted and developed during Wade's tenure brought Philadelphia its first World Series championship in 28 years. Gillick, Wade's successor, referred to the 2008 champs as “Ed Wade’s team” during the post-victory celebration.

Houston Astros
Following two seasons of pro scouting for the San Diego Padres, Wade was named the General Manager of the Houston Astros on September 20, 2007. 

In his four years as the Astros GM, Wade again went through another rebuild, which saw him trade players such as Lance Berkman, Brad Lidge, Roy Oswalt and Hunter Pence away for prospects. The 2008 team finished 86-75, the only winning season in Wade's tenure. The 2011 team lost 106 games, a franchise record. Following the 2011 season, longtime owner Drayton McLane sold the team to Jim Crane, The sale of the team was approved by Major League owners on November 26, 2011, and Wade was dismissed two days later. 

Early in the 2011 season, Wade promoted future American League MVP second baseman José Altuve (signed by the Astros in early 2007) directly from Class AA Corpus Christi to the major league level. Among the numerous Major League players drafted by the Astros on Wade's watch were future 2015 Cy Young Award-winning pitcher Dallas Keuchel and future 2017 World Series MVP outfielder George Springer. Altuve, Keuchel and Springer were three key players in the franchise's first World Series Championship in 2017.

As of 2015, there were 37 players performing in the Major Leagues who were in the Astros’ organization at the time of Wade's dismissal in 2011.

Return to Philadelphia 

Wade returned to the Phillies in December 2011 as a special consultant and professional scout. He remained with the team until the end of the 2017 season.

References

External links

Philadelphia Phillies executives
Houston Astros executives
Major League Baseball general managers
San Diego Padres scouts
Living people
1956 births
Temple University alumni